The 1996 Indianapolis Colts season was the 44th season for the team in the National Football League and 13th in Indianapolis. The Indianapolis Colts finished the National Football League's 1996 season with a record of 9 wins and 7 losses, and finished third in the AFC East division.

On October 13, the Colts hosted the newly established Baltimore Ravens, based in the Colts' previous city. The Colts won 26–21. This game has the distinction of being the first NFL on TNT broadcast after TNT's parent Turner Broadcasting System completed its merger with Time Warner only 3 days earlier.

The season saw the Colts draft Marvin Harrison. Harrison would go on to become a member of the Pro Football Hall of Fame, after spending his entire career as a Colt. Harrison was named to Pro Bowl several times and later helped the Colts win a Super Bowl in 2006. He continued to play for the team until 2008 and  retired during the 2009 season.

Offseason

NFL draft

Personnel

Staff

Roster

Regular season

Schedule

Standings

Playoffs
The team received a Wild Card playoff berth to the playoffs and traveled to Pittsburgh to play the Steelers. The Colts came back from a 13-point lead in the first half but the Steelers scored 29 unanswered points in the second half and went on to beat the Colts.

See also
History of the Indianapolis Colts
List of Indianapolis Colts seasons
Colts–Patriots rivalry

Indianapolis Colts
Indianapolis Colts seasons
Colts